Erford Holmes Gage (April 5, 1912 – March 17, 1945) was an American actor. After several years as a stage actor, he was active in Hollywood films between 1942 and 1944. In his movies, he often played shady characters or outright villains, most notably the sadistic Nazi Dr. Schmidt in Hitler's Children. In a different vein, he appeared as the no-nonsense Sgt. Burke in the two low-budget GI comedies starring the team of Brown and Carney.

Personal life
Gage served as a staff sergeant in the 20th Infantry Regiment of the United States Army during World War II and was killed in action during the Battle of Luzon on March 17, 1945. During his service, he was awarded the Silver Star, Bronze Star Medal, and Purple Heart. He is buried at Manila American Cemetery. According to obituaries at the time, his widow was actress Nell King.

Filmography

References

External links

1912 births
1945 deaths
People from Northfield, Massachusetts
Male actors from Massachusetts
American male film actors
20th-century American male actors
United States Army non-commissioned officers
United States Army personnel killed in World War II
Recipients of the Silver Star
Burials at the Manila American Cemetery